Transcription factor SOX-18 is a protein that in humans is encoded by the SOX18 gene.

Function 

This gene encodes a member of the SOX (SRY-related HMG-box) family of transcription factors involved in the regulation of embryonic development and in the determination of the cell fate. The encoded protein may act as a transcriptional regulator after forming a protein complex with other proteins. This protein plays a role in hair, blood vessel, and lymphatic vessel development. Mutations in this gene have been associated with recessive and dominant forms of hypotrichosis-lymphedema-telangiectasia (HLTS). An autosomal truncating dominant mutation in this gene has also been associated with renal failure in the condition hypotrichosis-lymphedema-telangiectasia-renal defect syndrome (HLTRS).

Interactions 

SOX18 has been shown to interact with:

MEF2C

RBPJ

See also 
 SOX genes

References

Further reading

External links 
 

Transcription factors